Penang Sports Club is a private members sports club and cricket ground, established in the year 1936. The ground has hosted cricket matches for Malaya and then Malaysia.

See also
 Sport in Malaysia

References

External links
 http://www.pgsportsclub.com.my/cricket.htm
 https://cricketarchive.com/Archive/Grounds/17/3217.html

Cricket grounds in Malaysia
Sports venues in Penang
Buildings and structures in George Town, Penang